William Russell Drew (7 February 1890 – 30 July 1955) was an Australian rules footballer who played with Fitzroy in the Victorian Football League (VFL).

Notes

External links 

1890 births
1955 deaths
Australian rules footballers from Victoria (Australia)
Fitzroy Football Club players